Qadria is a genus of true bugs belonging to the family Cicadellidae (leafhoppers). Belonging to the Erythroneurini tribe, Qadria consists of fourteen species.

The genus was first described by Mahmood in 1967, and the species are found in Asia.

Species 
Species of the genus Qadria are:
Qadria bannaensis 
Qadria bella 
Qadria cajanae 
Qadria cucullata 
Qadria daliensis 
Qadria dongfanga 
Qadria erythromaculata 
Qadria guiyanga 
Qadria pakistanica 
Qadria plamista 
Qadria planiensis 
Qadria rubronotata 
Qadria setosa 
Qadria tandojamensis

References 

Cicadellidae genera
Erythroneurini